The Dukes of Hazzard: Return of the General Lee is a racing video game developed by Ratbag Games and published by Ubisoft. It was released in 2004 for the PlayStation 2 and Xbox consoles. The game is based on the television series The Dukes of Hazzard and was released to coincide with The Dukes of Hazzard film, which was released in 2005.

It was the last title developed by Ratbag Games before their acquisition by Midway Games on 4 August 2005 and closure on 15 December of the same year.

Plot
The Duke cousins must help Hazzard County's local foster home to pay off its debt in order to remain operational. Boss Hogg has raised the mortgage price for the foster home and is having the interest compounded hourly.  He's doing this to fund the building of a statue of himself to be located in the town square and to build a local water reservoir on the site of the foster home's location with the help of Rosco. The player must help the Dukes complete a series of tasks in order to save the foster home before it gets shut down completely. There is a free roam feature which allows the player to drive across all of Hazzard County and enjoy the freedom of ramping the General Lee on various objects in order to unlock hidden objects in this game.

Reception

The PlayStation 2 version received "mixed" reviews, while the Xbox version received "generally unfavorable reviews", according to video game review aggregator Metacritic.

References

External links
Official webspace on Ubisoft's site

2004 video games
Return of the General Lee
PlayStation 2 games
Ubisoft games
Vehicular combat games
Video games developed in Australia
Xbox games
Video games set in Georgia (U.S. state)
Multiplayer and single-player video games